Westlake High School is located at 825 Westlake Drive in Thornwood, New York, United States. It serves the Mount Pleasant Central School District, including the hamlets of Hawthorne and Thornwood, and parts of the hamlet of Valhalla and the village of Pleasantville.

The campus of Westlake High School includes Westlake Middle School and the Mt. Pleasant Central School District's office.

Athletics

Athletics at Westlake include Football, Tennis, Soccer, Volleyball, Wrestling, Cheerleading, Track, Baseball, Lacrosse, Swimming, and Ice Hockey.

Notable alumni

 Rob Astorino (class of 1985) -  Westchester County Executive; media personality, radio host, and program director for the Catholic Channel on SIRIUS Satellite Radio
 Ernie Sabella (class of 1968) - actor (Saved By The Bell, Seinfeld, Perfect Strangers); voice of Pumba in Disney's The Lion King
 Michael C. Williams (class of 1991) - actor (The Blair Witch Project)

References

External links
 https://whs.mtplcsd.org/ School home page

Public high schools in New York (state)
Schools in Westchester County, New York
Mount Pleasant, New York
1962 establishments in New York (state)